Hearsay, in law, refers to a testimony based on what a witness heard rather than what they witnessed personally.

Hearsay or Hear Say may also refer to:

Music
 Hear'Say, a British pop group
 Hearsay, an American girl group that included Ciara
 Hearsay (album), by Alexander O'Neal, 1987
 "Hearsay" (song), by Alexander O'Neal, 1989
 "Hearsay", a song by Colette Carr from Skitszo, 2013
 "Hearsay", a song by The Gladiators from Trenchtown Mix Up, 1976
 "Hearsay", a song by The Soul Children, 1972
 "Hear Say", a song by Ja Rule from The Mirror, 2007

Other uses 
 Terence Hearsay, a fictional character in the poem cycle A Shropshire Lad by A. E. Housman

See also 
 Heresay (album), by Paul McCandless, 1988
 Heresy (disambiguation)
 Gossip
 Rumor